Michael Hills Westgarth (29 July 1908 – 1972) was an English footballer who played as an outside right in the Football League for Darlington.

Westgarth was born in Hetton-le-Hole, County Durham, in 1908. The 1911 UK Census records him living in that town with his parents, John George Westgarth, a coal miner, and Mary Alice, and his five surviving siblings.

He played football for Northern League club Stockton, and signed for Third Division North club Darlington in March 1931. He made his debut in the Football League on 28 March, replacing Jack Hill at centre forward for the visit to Chesterfield. He scored his first and what proved to be only League goal in a 4–2 win against local rivals Hartlepools United a week later. By the start of the following season, he was playing on the wing. His Darlington career ended that season, after 11 appearances, and he returned to non-league football with Shildon.

Westgarth died in County Durham in 1972 at the age of 63.

Notes

References

1908 births
1972 deaths
People from Hetton-le-Hole
Footballers from Tyne and Wear
English footballers
Association football wingers
Stockton F.C. players
Darlington F.C. players
Shildon A.F.C. players
Northern Football League players
English Football League players
Date of death missing